Murati is a village in Rõuge Parish, Võru County in southeastern Estonia. Between 1991 and 2017 (until the administrative reform of Estonian municipalities) the village was located in Haanja Parish.

See also
Lake Murati

References

External links
Satellite map at Maplandia.com

Villages in Võru County
Estonia–Latvia border crossings